The 2023 season will be the New York Giants' upcoming 99th in the National Football League and their second under the head coach/general manager tandem of Brian Daboll and Joe Schoen. The Giants will look to improve upon their 9-7-1 record from last year and make the playoffs in back to back seasons for the first time since 2006 and 2007.

Offseason

Free agency

Players with the New York Giants in 2022

Source:

Players with other teams in 2022

Source:

Trades and other signings

Roster transactions

Draft

Notes
 The Giants traded WR Kadarius Toney to Kansas City in exchange for a 2023 third-round compensatory pick and a 2023 sixth-round pick.
 The Giants traded sixth-round pick (#204) to Houston in exchange for cornerback Keion Crossen. 
 Baltimore traded their 2023 seventh-round pick, a 2022 fifth-round pick (used to select Marcus McKethan), and guard Ben Bredeson to New York for a 2022 fourth-round pick (used to select Daniel Faalele).
 The Giants traded the 2023 third-round 2020 Resolution JC-2A pick (#100) received from Kansas City in the Toney trade to the Las Vegas Raiders in exchange for tight end Darren Waller.

Staff

Current roster

Preseason
The Giants' preseason opponents and schedule will be announced in the spring.

Regular season

2023 opponents
Listed below are the Giants' opponents for 2023. Exact dates and times will be announced in the spring.

References

External links
 

New York Giants
New York Giants seasons
New York Giants